Thomas B. Coursey House is a historic home located north of Coursey Pond near Felton, Kent County, Delaware.  It was built in 1867, and is a three-story, five bay, low hip-roofed, center-hall passage, single-pile, rectangular plan, large frame house.  It has Italianate-style design details.  Attached to the main house are a two-story, shed-roofed north wing and to the east there is a recently added one-story, shed-roofed wing. It was the home of Thomas B. Coursey, a prominent figure in 19th century Kent County.

It was listed on the National Register of Historic Places in 1990.

References

Houses on the National Register of Historic Places in Delaware
Italianate architecture in Delaware
Houses completed in 1867
Houses in Kent County, Delaware
National Register of Historic Places in Kent County, Delaware